35 (thirty-five) is the natural number following 34 and preceding 36.

In mathematics 
 

35 is the sum of the first five triangular numbers, making it a tetrahedral number.

35 is the number of ways that three things can be selected from a set of seven unique things, also known as the "combination of seven things taken three at a time".

35 is a centered cube number, a centered tetrahedral number, a pentagonal number, and a pentatope number.

35 is a highly cototient number, since there are more solutions to the equation  than there are for any other integers below it except 1.

There are 35 free hexominoes, the polyominoes made from six squares.

35 is the tenth discrete semiprime and the first with 5 as the lowest non-unitary factor. The aliquot sum of 35 is 13, this being the second composite number with such an aliquot sum; the first being the cube 27. 35 is the last member of the first triple cluster of semiprimes 33, 34, 35. The second such triple discrete semiprime cluster is 85, 86, 87.

35 is the highest number one can count to on one's fingers using senary.

35 is the number of quasigroups of order 4.

35 is the smallest composite number of the form , where  is a non-negative integer.

In science
The atomic number of bromine

In other fields 
 35 mm film is the basic film gauge most commonly used for both analog photography and motion pictures.
 The minimum age of presidential candidates for election to the United States, Ireland, Poland, Russia, Trinidad and Tobago, and Uruguay.
 For Social Security in the United States, the 35 highest years of earnings are used to calculate retirement benefits.

See also
 List of highways numbered 35

References 

Integers